Reverie is the second studio album by American singer and songwriter Ben Platt. It was released on August 13, 2021, through Atlantic Records. Two songs were released from the album on April 23, 2021, and July 16, 2021, respectively: "Imagine" and "Happy to Be Sad".

Track listing

Charts

Release history

Tour

On August 14, 2021, Platt announced his second concert tour to promote Reverie, scheduled to begin February 23, 2022. The tour was later postponed due to the COVID pandemic and rescheduled to begin on September 3, 2022 in Seattle, Washington before concluding in Miami, Florida on October 7, 2022, for a total of 20 stops. The tour featured opening acts from Aly and AJ and Chappell Roan. The set list included songs from Reverie, his first album Sing to Me Instead, some covers, and some Broadway tunes.<ref>{{cite web |last1=Hamblin |first1=Abby |title=Ben Platt is back home on a concert stage, and it's a 'Reverie |url=https://www.latimes.com/entertainment-arts/story/2022-08-31/ben-platt-tour-interview |website=Los Angeles Times |date=31 August 2022 |access-date=20 September 2022}}</ref>

Platt played tribute to the closing of Broadway’s Dear Evan Hansen'' on September 18, 2022 by performing "Waving Through a Window" at the Nashville stop of the tour.

References

2021 albums
Albums produced by Alex Hope (songwriter)
Albums produced by Jon Bellion
Atlantic Records albums
Ben Platt albums
LGBT-related albums